Von Erdmannsdorff is the name of:
 Friedrich Wilhelm von Erdmannsdorff (1736–1800), German architect
 Gottfried von Erdmannsdorff (1893-1946), German Wehrmacht general
 Otto von Erdmannsdorff (1888–1978), German diplomat